Yorktown is an unincorporated community in Tuscarawas County, in the U.S. state of Ohio.

History
A post office called Yorktown was established in 1881, and remained in operation until 1884. Besides the post office, Yorktown had a station on the Marietta and Pittsburgh Railroad.

References

Unincorporated communities in Tuscarawas County, Ohio
Unincorporated communities in Ohio